The  is a river in Fukui Prefecture, Japan. It stretches  from Mount Kanmuri in the town of Ikeda to the Hino and the Kuzuryū rivers.

Row of Sakura
About 600 cherry trees are planted along the levees in the center of the city of Fukui. Many cherry trees are lit up every year when they are in full bloom (early to mid-April), leading many visitors to come see the blossoms on the levee. Other nearby places with famous cherry trees include Maruoka Castle and the Ichijōdani Asakura Family Historic Ruins.

River communities
The river passes through the following communities:

Fukui Prefecture
Ikeda, Fukui

External links
 Flower viewing along the Asuwa River 
 Row of Sakura along the Asuwa River 
 (confluence with Hino River)

Rivers of Fukui Prefecture
Rivers of Japan